Arzfeld is a municipality in the district Bitburg-Prüm, in Rhineland-Palatinate, Germany. It is situated in the Eifel, near the border with Luxembourg, approx. 20 km north-west of Bitburg and 25 km south-east of Sankt-Vith.

Arzfeld is the seat of the Verbandsgemeinde ("collective municipality") Arzfeld.

References

Bitburg-Prüm
Populated places in the Eifel